Colleen Rose Meyer (March 8, 1939 – July 17, 2015) was an American businesswoman and politician.

Meyer was born in Honolulu, Hawaii Territory. She graduated from Punahou School, in 1957, and received her associate degree, in 1959, from the College of San Mateo in San Mateo, California. Meyer was involved in the real estate business and lived in Kaneohe, Hawaii. Meyer served in the Hawaii House of Representatives from 1995 to 2008 and was a Republican. Meyer died at her home in Kaneohe, Hawaii, from cancer.

Notes

1939 births
2015 deaths
Politicians from Honolulu
Businesspeople from Hawaii
Punahou School alumni
College of San Mateo alumni
Women state legislators in Hawaii
Republican Party members of the Hawaii House of Representatives
Deaths from cancer in Hawaii
20th-century American businesspeople
20th-century American women
21st-century American women